The 1884 Vermont gubernatorial election took place on September 2, 1884. Incumbent Republican John L. Barstow, per the "Mountain Rule", did not run for re-election to a second term as Governor of Vermont. Republican candidate Samuel E. Pingree defeated Democratic candidate Lyman W. Redington to succeed him.

Results

References

Vermont
1884
Gubernatorial
September 1884 events